Eric Epstein is a former teacher, college professor, state Senate candidate, self-employed consultant, government reform activist, radio host and nuclear watchdog from Pennsylvania.

2004 Senate Election
In 2004, Epstein lost to State Senator Jeffrey Piccola in the race for Pennsylvania's 15th senatorial district.

References

External links
Rock The Capital Website
2004 Pennsylvania Senate Election Results

Living people
Political activists from Pennsylvania
Pennsylvania Democrats
American anti–nuclear power activists
Year of birth missing (living people)